Farra Kober is an American television producer and digital content strategist.

Career 
Kober is currently the Director of Social Media and Community at MSNBC.

Personal life
In 2012, she married actor Andrew Kober, with whom she has a son, born 2016.

Awards

References 

Year of birth missing (living people)
Living people
Brown University alumni
American television producers
American women television producers
21st-century American women